Charles T. Gorham (May 29, 1812 – March 11, 1901) was a Michigan banker and diplomat.  He was one of the founders of the Republican party, an anti-slavery activist and a major general and division commander in the Michigan Militia during the years immediately preceding the American Civil War.  After the war he served as United States Ambassador to the Netherlands and Assistant Secretary of the Interior.

Life and career
Charles Truesdell Gorham was born in Danbury, Connecticut on May 29, 1812.  He was raised in Oneonta, New York and trained for a business career.

In 1836 Gorham moved to Marshall, Michigan where he was a merchant.  In 1840 he started a bank, which he operated privately until 1865.  That year he incorporated the institution as the First National Bank of Marshall, and he served as President until retiring in 1898.

Originally a Democrat and later a Whig, Gorham was one of the founders of the Republican party when it was organized in the mid-1850s.  In 1855 he was appointed Major General and commander of one of three divisions in the state militia, and in 1859 he was elected to one term in the Michigan State Senate.  Gorham used both positions to recruit, train, and reorganize the militia in anticipation of the Civil War.  He was a Delegate to the Republican National Conventions of 1864 and 1868, and served as a Presidential elector from Michigan in 1868, casting votes for the ticket of Ulysses S. Grant and Schuyler Colfax.

An anti-slavery activist and participant in the Underground Railroad, Gorham was one of the principals in the Crosswhite Affair, in which several individuals from Kentucky attempted to capture an African American family in Marshall and return them to slavery in Kentucky.  More than 200 individuals from Marshall led by Gorham prevented this act.  The Crosswhite Affair was the subject of several criminal and civil court cases, including the Giltner v. Gorham et al. federal case of June, 1848. It was one of the events that led to passage of the Fugitive Slave Act of 1850.

From 1870 to 1875 Gorahm served as Minister to the Netherlands.  He served as Assistant Secretary of the Interior from March, 1876 to April, 1877, afterwards returning to his banking interests in Marshall.

Gorham retired in 1898.  He died in Marshall on March 11, 1901.  Gorham was buried in Marshall's Oakridge Cemetery.

Charles T. Gorham was married to Charlotte Eaton Hart of Durham, New York on April 10, 1839.  They had two sons and one daughter—Selden H., Charles E. and Isabella.

References

1812 births
1901 deaths
People from Danbury, Connecticut
People from Oneonta, New York
People from Marshall, Michigan
Michigan Democrats
Michigan Whigs
19th-century American politicians
Michigan Republicans
American militia generals
Michigan state senators
19th-century American diplomats
Ambassadors of the United States to the Netherlands
1868 United States presidential electors
Underground Railroad people
Activists from New York (state)
Military personnel from Michigan